Eoin Concannon  (born 6 June 1988 in Galway) is a Gaelic football player who plays club football for St James' and inter-county for Galway from 2010 until he was dropped from the squad in 2014. 

Concannon represented the Galway Minor team in 2005 and 2006, winning a Connacht Minor Football Championship in 2005.

References

External links
 

1988 births
Living people
St James' (Galway) Gaelic footballers
Galway inter-county Gaelic footballers
Sportspeople from Galway (city)